Cortinarius meleagris, originally described as Rozites meleagris, is a species of mushroom native to New Zealand.

References 

meleagris
Fungi of New Zealand
Taxa named by Egon Horak